The Bakersfield sound is a sub-genre of country music developed in the mid-to-late 1950s in and around Bakersfield, California. Bakersfield was the first subgenre of country music significantly influenced by rock and roll, relying heavily on electric instrumentation and a strongly defined backbeat. It was also a reaction against the slickly produced, orchestra-laden Nashville sound, which was becoming popular in the late 1950s. The Bakersfield sound became one of the most popular and influential country genres of the 1960s, initiating a revival of honky-tonk music and influencing later country rock and outlaw country musicians.

Wynn Stewart pioneered the Bakersfield sound, while performing artists Buck Owens and Merle Haggard became two of the most successful artists of the original Bakersfield era while performing with The Buckaroos and The Strangers respectively. Other major Bakersfield country artists include Jean Shepard and Susan Raye.

History
The Bakersfield sound was developed at honky-tonk bars such as The Blackboard, and on local television stations in Bakersfield and throughout California in the 1950s and 1960s. The town, known mainly for agriculture and oil production, was the destination for many Dust Bowl migrants and others from Oklahoma, Texas, Arkansas, and parts of the Midwest. The mass migration of "Okies" to California also meant their music would follow and thrive, finding an audience in California's Central Valley.

Bakersfield country was a reaction to the slickly produced, string orchestra-laden Nashville sound, which was becoming popular in the late 1950s. One of the first groups to make it big on the West Coast was the Maddox Brothers and Rose, who were the first to wear outlandish costumes and make a "show" out of their performances. Artists such as Wynn Stewart used electric instruments and added a backbeat, as well as other stylistic elements borrowed from rock and roll. Important influences were Depression-era country music superstar Jimmie Rodgers, early 1950s honky tonk singer Lefty Frizzell, and 1940s Western swing musician Bob Wills.

In 1954, MGM recording artist Bud Hobbs recorded "Louisiana Swing" with Buck Owens on lead guitar, Bill Woods on piano, and the dual fiddles of Oscar Whittington and Jelly Sanders. "Louisiana Swing" was the first song recorded in the style known today as the "Bakersfield sound". In the early 1960s, Merle Haggard and Buck Owens and the Buckaroos, among others, brought the Bakersfield sound to mainstream audiences, and it soon became one of the most popular sounds in country music, helping spawn country rock and influencing later country stars such as Dwight Yoakam, Marty Stuart, The Mavericks, and The Derailers. Jean Shepard, one of country music's first significant female artists, began her recording career on the West Coast in the 1950s. Through Capitol Records, Shepard's "A Dear John Letter", was the first major country hit single to use entirely Bakersfield musicians. Many of her early recording sessions featured prominent members of the Bakersfield movement, including Lewis Talley and Speedy West. Susan Raye was also a major figure in the Bakersfield sound, particularly in the 1970s, with hits such as "L.A. International Airport". She was also a member of Buck Owens' road show and recorded several hit duets with him. Other women to emerge from the West Coast country movement include Bonnie Owens, Kay Adams, and Rosie Flores.

Two important British Invasion-era rock bands displayed some Bakersfield influences. The Beatles recorded a popular version of Owens' "Act Naturally". Years later, the Rolling Stones made their connection explicit in the lyrics of the very Bakersfield-sounding "Far Away Eyes", which begins: "I was driving home early Sunday morning, through Bakersfield".

The Bakersfield sound has such a large influence on the West Coast music scene that many small guitar companies set up shop in Bakersfield in the 1960s. The most significant was the Mosrite guitar company that still influences rock, country, and jazz music to this day. The famed Mosrite company was located in Bakersfield until the death of the company's founder, Oildale resident Semie Moseley, in 1992.

Buck Owens and the Buckaroos
Buck Owens and the Buckaroos developed it further, incorporating different styles of music to fit Owens' musical tastes. The music style features a raw set of twin Fender Telecasters with a picking style (as opposed to strumming), a big drum beat, and fiddle, with an occasional "in your face" pedal steel guitar. The Fender Telecaster was originally developed for country musicians to fit in with the Texas/Western swing style of music that was popular in the Western US following World War II. The music, like Owens, was rebellious for its time and is dependent on a musician's individual talents, as opposed to the elaborate orchestral production common with Nashville-style country music.

Buck Owens not only aided in the development of the Bakersfield sound, he also helped preserve its history. In 1996, Owens opened Buck Owens Crystal Palace in Bakersfield, which served as both a nightclub for country music performers and as a museum of the history and sound of country music, including the Bakersfield sound. Owens regularly performed at the Crystal Palace until his death in 2006.

In an interview, Dwight Yoakam defined the term "Bakersfield sound":
'Bakersfield' really is not exclusively limited to the town itself but encompasses the larger California country sound of the '40s, '50s and on into the '60s, and even the '70s, with the music of Emmylou Harris, Gram Parsons, the Burrito Brothers and the Eagles -- they are all an extension of the 'Bakersfield sound' and a byproduct of it.  I've got a poster of Buck Owens performing at the Fillmore West in 1968 in Haight-Ashbury!  What went on there led to there being a musical incarnation called country rock.  I don't know if there would have been a John Fogerty and Creedence Clearwater Revival had there not been the California country music that's come to be known as the 'Bakersfield sound'. 

The magazines No Depression and Blue Suede News regularly feature Bakersfield sound enthusiasts, while podcasts such as Radio Free Bakersfield carry on the tradition online.

References

Further reading

External links
Americana Music News, Reviews, Interviews and Podcast Shows
Updated information on Bakersfield roots musicians in Bakersfield and elsewhere
comprehensive newspaper series, written by journalist Robert Price, The Bakersfield Californian.
Music Fog - Americana Music. Daily videos of exclusive performances.

<

 
Music scenes
San Joaquin Valley
1950s in California